Qazi Muhammad Nizamuddin is an Indian politician from Uttarakhand and a three term Member of the Uttarakhand Legislative Assembly. Nizamuddin represents the Manglaur Assembly constituency. Nizamuddin is a Secretary of the Indian National Congress.

Positions held

Elections contested

References
 http://myneta.info/utk07/candidate.php?candidate_id=57
 http://myneta.info/utt2012/index.php?action=show_candidates&constituency_id=33
 http://myneta.info/uttarakhand2017/candidate.php?candidate_id=442

Living people
20th-century Indian politicians
Indian National Congress politicians from Uttarakhand
People from Haridwar district
1974 births